The Battle of Kizaki (木崎原の戦い) occurred in June 1572 when the forces of Shimazu Yoshihiro defeated the larger army of Itō Yoshisuke. The battle, also known as "The Okehazama of the south".

Following their capture of Obi, the Itō strengthened their position on southern Hyūga and began encroaching on territory belonging to the Shimazu clan. Yoshisuke desired to expand into Ōsumi and with that in mind supported clans antagonizing the Shimazu. Still the Shimazu were able to control Ōsumi and in 1572 offered battle to Yoshisuke in the plain of Kizaki, at the border between the two provinces. The armies at Kizaki had a great disparity in strength, the Shimazu only fielded 300 warriors while the Itō possessed as many as 3000. 
Outnumbered 10:1, the Shimazu stood in a defensive position and were able to gain victory using their famous feigned retreat.

The battle, also known as "The Okehazama of the south", due to how devastating Yoshihiro's victory was, seriously damaged the forces of  the Ito clan and the Shimazu were left in a position to expand north, into southern Hyūga. Four years later, the Shimazu would conclude the destruction of the Itō when they captured Takabaru, forcing Yoshisake to flee into Ōtomo lands.

References 

Kizaki
1572 in Japan
Shimazu clan
Conflicts in 1572